The General Electric LM2500 is an industrial and marine gas turbine produced by GE Aviation. The LM2500 is a derivative of the General Electric CF6 aircraft engine.

As of 2004, the U.S. Navy and at least 29 other navies had used a total of more than one thousand LM2500/LM2500+ gas turbines to power warships. Other uses include hydrofoils, hovercraft and fast ferries.

In 2012, GE developed an FPSO version to serve the oil and gas industry's demand for a lighter, more compact version to generate electricity and drive compressors to send natural gas through pipelines.

Design and development

The LM2500 was first used on the US Navy  in 1969, after the original FT-4 gas turbines experienced many technical problems. This configuration was subsequently used into the 1980s in the s, and s. It was also used by one of People's Republic of China's Type 052 Luhu Class Missile Destroyer (Harbin 112) acquired before the embargo.

In 2001 the LM2500 (20 MW) was installed in a sound-proof capsule in the South African Navy  (Meko A-200 SAN) frigates as part of a CODAG propulsion system with two MTU 16V 1163 TB93 Propulsion Diesels.

LM2500 installations place the engine inside a metal container for sound and heat isolation from the rest of the machinery spaces. This container is very near the size of a standard  intermodal shipping container – but not the same, the engine size very slightly exceeds those dimensions. The air intake ducting may be designed and shaped appropriately for easy removal of the LM2500 from their ships.

Two of such turbo-generators have been installed in the superstructure near the funnel of Queen Mary 2, the world's largest transatlantic ocean liner, for additional electric energy when the ship's four diesel-generators are working at maximum capacity or fail. Celebrity Cruises uses two LM2500+ engines in their s in a COGAS cycle.

The LM2500 is license-built in Japan by IHI Corporation, in India by Hindustan Aeronautics Limited, and in Italy by Avio Aero.

The LM2500/LM2500+ can often be found as turbine part of CODAG, CODOG, CODLAG propulsion systems or in pairs as powerplants for COGAG systems.

Applications
Aircraft carrier:
  (Italian Navy)
  (Royal Thai Navy)
  (Spanish Navy)
  (Indian Navy)

Amphibious assault ship:
  (United States Navy)
  (Royal Australian Navy)
  (Spanish Navy)
  (United States Navy)
Cruiser:
  (United States Navy)
Destroyer:
  (United States Navy)
  (Royal Australian Navy)
  (Japan Maritime Self-Defense Force)
  (Italian Navy)
  (Republic of Korea Navy)
  (Republic of China Navy)
  (Republic of Korea Navy)
  (Japan Maritime Self-Defense Force)
  (United States Navy)
 Type 052 destroyer (People's Liberation Army Navy)
 Project 18 (Indian Navy)
Frigate:
  (Royal Australian Navy)
   (Spanish Navy)
  (Royal Australian Navy, Royal New Zealand Navy)
  (German Navy)
  (Turkish Navy)
  (German Navy)
  (German Navy)
  (Republic of China Navy)
  (United States Navy)
 FREMM multipurpose frigate (French Navy, Italian Navy, Royal Moroccan Navy)
  (Royal Norwegian Navy)
  (Royal Canadian Navy)
  (French Navy, Italian Navy)
  (Hellenic Navy)
  (Pakistan Navy)
  (Royal Thai Navy)
  (Indian Navy)
  (United States Navy)
  (German Navy)
  (Spanish Navy)
  (Indian Navy)
  (South African Navy)
  (Portuguese Navy)
  (Republic of Korea Navy)
  (Turkish Navy)
Fast Combat Support Ship:
  (United States Navy)
Maritime Prepositioning Force:
  (United States Navy)
Littoral combat ship:
  (United States Navy)
Corvette:
  (Finnish Navy)
  (Royal Danish Navy)
  (Israeli Navy)
  (Philippine Navy)
  (Brazilian Navy)
  (Turkish Navy)
Maritime Security Cutter, Large:
  (United States Coast Guard)
''Fast Attack Patrol boat
  (United States Navy)

Variants 
The LM2500 is available in 3 different versions:
 The LM2500 delivers  with a thermal efficiency of 37 percent at ISO conditions.  When coupled with an electric generator, it delivers 24 MW of electricity at 60 Hz with a thermal efficiency of 36 percent at ISO conditions.
 The improved, 3rd generation, LM2500+ version of the turbine delivers  with a thermal efficiency of 39 percent at ISO conditions.  When coupled with an electric generator, it delivers 29 MW of electricity at 60 Hz with a thermal efficiency of 38 percent at ISO conditions.
 The latest, 4th generation, LM2500+G4 version was introduced in November 2005 and delivers 47,370 shp (35,320 kW) with a thermal efficiency of 39.3 percent at ISO conditions.

Derivatives 
 The GE TM2500 is derived from the LM2500, and mounted on a trailer that makes it possible to move it to wherever 30 MW of temporary electricity generation is required. It can be installed and commissioned in 11 days.

Specification
The basic LM2500 has a single shaft gas generator derived from the CF6, comprising a 16 stage compressor driven by a two stage air-cooled HP turbine. The combustion chamber is annular. Shaft power is generated by a 6-stage power turbine mounted in the gas generator exhaust stream  Additional power is obtained from the LM2500+ by the addition of a zero stage to the compressor, making 17 stages in all.
Specifications for three models of LM2500 series gas turbine engines:

See also

References

External links

 Official GE Aviation page for LM2500 (GEAE).
 Official GE Aviation page for LM2500+.
 Official GE Aviation page for LM2500+G4.
 FAS information page on US Navy LM2500 usage
 SA Navy Valour class frigate page
 Power Generation plants
 Simple and combined cycle 50 Hz
 Simple and combined cycle 60 Hz

Aero-derivative engines
Gas turbines
Marine engines